Upper Canada is a former British colony in North America.

Upper Canada may also refer to:

Bank of Upper Canada, a Canadian bank that existed from 1821 to 1866
Upper Canada Brewing Company, a brewery in Guelph, Ontario, Canada
Upper Canada College, a private school in Toronto, Ontario, Canada
Upper Canada Mall, a shopping mall in Newmarket, Ontario, Canada
Upper Canada Village, a heritage park in Morrisburg, Ontario, Canada
Upper Canada, a hamlet of Hutton, Somerset, U.K.

See also